South Forest is a rural locality in the local government area (LGA) of Circular Head in the North-west and west LGA region of Tasmania. The 2016 census recorded a population of 101 for the state suburb of South Forest.

History 
South Forest was gazetted as a locality in 1973.

Geography
Black River forms much of the eastern boundary.

Road infrastructure 
Route C219 (Mengha Road) runs through from north to south.

References

Towns in Tasmania
Localities of Circular Head Council